The  Incheon Munhak Stadium  (also known as Incheon World Cup Stadium or Munhak Stadium) is a sports complex in Incheon, South Korea and includes a multi-purpose stadium, a baseball park, and other sports facilities.

Facilities

Incheon Munhak Stadium 
Incheon Munhak Stadium, initially named Incheon World Cup Stadium, was Incheon United's home stadium from 2004 to 2011. It hosted three group stage matches at the 2002 FIFA World Cup. It also hosted the 2005 Asian Athletics Championships and the football matches during the 2014 Asian Games, as well as the opening and closing ceremonies of the 2014 Asian Para Games. In November 2018, the stadium hosted the 2018 League of Legends World Championship final.

2002 World Cup matches played in Munhak Stadium

Munhak Baseball Stadium 

The Munhak Baseball Stadium is the home baseball stadium of the SSG Landers and lies adjacent to the Incheon Munhak Stadium.

References

인천 문학 경기장, 시민을 품은 희망의 돛  - Dream stadium of K-League

External links 
 Incheon Sports Facilities Management Center 
 SK Wyverns  
 Incheon United Official Site 
 World Stadiums

Sports venues in Incheon
2002 FIFA World Cup stadiums in South Korea
Football venues in South Korea
Rugby union stadiums in South Korea
Athletics (track and field) venues in South Korea
Venues of the 2014 Asian Games
Sports venues completed in 2002
Esports venues in South Korea